Shengavit (Šengavit' varčakan šrĵan), is one of the 12 districts of Yerevan, the capital of Armenia, located at the southwestern part of the city. It has common borders with the districts of Malatia-Sebastia, Kentron, Erebuni and Nubarashen. Ararat Province forms the southern borders of the district.

Overview

With an area of 48.5 km² (18.16% of Yerevan city area), Shengavit is the 2nd-largest district of Yerevan in terms of area. It is unofficially divided into smaller neighborhoods such as Lower Shengavit, Upper Shengavit, Lower Charbakh, Upper Charbakh, Noragavit and Aeratsia. Garegin Nzhdeh Square along with the metro station form the core of the district. The main streets of the district are Garegin Nzhdeh Street, Shirak Street, Artashesyan Street, Bagratunyats Street and Arshakunyats Avenue.

The joint civil and military Erebuni Airport is located in the district. The district is also home to the Yerevan Thermal Power Plant.

Shengavit is one of the highly industrialized districts of Yerevan with many large plants and factories. However, the district is considered to be home to middle and low-income residents of Yerevan.

The district has many parks with the most notable ones are Komitas Pantheon and park, Artur Karapetyan park, Movses Gorgisyan park and Shoghakat park.

As of 2016, the population of the district is around 139,100.

History

Antiquity

The area of modern day Shengavit has been populated since at least 3200 BC, during the period of Kura–Araxes culture of the Early Bronze Age. Excavations at the Shengavit historical site started in 1936 and lasted until 1938 under the guidance of archaeologist Yevgeny Bayburdyan who dug a trial trench at the hill which in turn led to further archaeological work to be done at the site. Archaeologist Sandro Sardarian resumed the excavations between 1958 and 1983, but his work was poorly documented. He left insufficient records to pinpoint exact locations where artifacts were found. 

In 2000, extensive excavation process was launched under the guidance of archaeologist Hakop Simonyan, who dug stratigraphic trenches at the edges of the old trenches excavated by Bayburdian and Sardarian. 

In 2009, Simonyan was joined by professor Mitchell S. Rothman from Widener University of Pennsylvania. Together they conducted three series of excavations in 2009, 2010, and 2012 respectively. During the process, a full stratigraphic column to bedrock was reached, showing there to be 8 or 9 distinct stratigraphic levels. These levels cover a time between 3200 BC and 2500 BC. Evidences of later use of the site (until 2200 BC) were also found. The excavation process revealed a series of large buildings, round buildings with square adjoining rooms and simple round buildings. Particularly notable are a series of ritual installations discovered in 2010 and 2012.

The archaeological site of Karmir Blur dates back to the first half of the 7th century BC. It is home to the historical city of Teishebaini was built by Rusa II of Urartu.

Modern history
After the Sovietization of Armenia, the administrative area of Erivan (Yerevan) was gradually expanded to include the abandoned settlements of historic Shengavit. In 1938, the Spandaryan raion (Спандарянский район) was formed by the decision of the Supreme Soviet of the Armenian SSR, thus laying foundation for the future Shengavit District. 

Charbakh neighbourhood which is currently within the Shengavit District, was originally formed as a small village in 1924 at the south of the historic Teishebaini site of Karmir Blur hill. The name Charbakh is derived from the Persian words of char (چهار) meaning four, and bagh (باغ) meaning garden. The origin of the name is from the 4 farms or gardens that existed earlier in the area at the southeast of Shengavit, on the left bank of Hrazdan River. The village was mainly home to Armenian migrants from Nakhichevan and Van. With the notable expansion of Charbakh during the 1950s, the village was divided into Verin Charbakh (Higher Charbakh) and Nerkin Charbakh (Lower Charbakh). In 1958, Charbakh became part of the newly-formed Shahumyan raion (Шаумянский район), thus becoming absorbed by the city Yerevan.

After the independence of Armenia, the Shengavit District was formed in 1996, including the territories of the former Spandaryan raion (Спандарянский район), parts of the former Ordzhonikidze raion (Орджоникидзевский район), and the neighbourhood of Charbakh of the former Shahumyan raion (Шаумянский район).

Demographics

As of the 2011 census, the district had a population of 135,535 (12.78% of Yerevan city population). According to the 2016 official estimate, the population of the district is around 139,100 (ranked 1st among the Yerevan districts).

Shengavit is mainly populated by Armenians who belong to the Armenian Apostolic Church. The district is home to the following churches:
Surp Gevork Church of Noragavit, dating back to the 17th century.
Surp Kiraki Church of Noragavt, dating back to the 19th century.
Surp Khach Zoravor Chapel, opened in 1991.
Surp Khach Church of Nerkin Charbakh, opened in 2006.

Culture
Shengavit has many public libraries including the Library №16 (1945), Library №32 (1946), Library №17 named after Shushanik Kurghinyan (1948), and Library №18 for children (1980). The Shengavit №5 House of culture is operating in Noragavit since 1948. 

Armen Tigranyan Music School (1949) and Stepan Jrbashyan Music School №8 (1965) are also located in Shengavit.

In 1992, the Metro Theatre of the National Center of Aesthetics was opened in the district.

Many cultural heritage monuments are located in the district, including:
Shengavit archaeological site dating back to 3200 BC,
Teishebaini ancient Urrartian settlement of the 8th century BC,
Komitas Pantheon opened in 1936.

Museums
Komitas Museum, opened in 2015.
 Shengavit Museum, opened in 1968.

Transportation

Shengavit District is served by a public transport network of buses and trolleybuses. However, the Yerevan underground metro has 4 stations within the district:
Gortsaranain station opened on 11 July 1983,
Shengavit station opened on 26 December 1985,
Garegin Nzhdeh Square station opened on 4 January 1987 (as Spandaryan Square station), 
Charbakh station, opened on 26 December 1996.

The Shengavit Electrodepot opened between 1981 and 1985 is the main depot of the Yerevan Metro, currently able to house more than 70 railroad cars.

The Noragavit neighbourhood of the district is served by the Noragavit railway station of the Armenian Railways.

Economy

Industry during the Soviet period

Shengavit became a highly industrialized district during the Soviet period. Large factories and manufacturing plants were built under the Soviet rule. The Armen-Carpet plant was opened in the district in 1924, followed by the Yerevan Plant of Rubber Technical Products in 1927. In 1930, the new building of Yerevan Machine-Tools plant (operating since 1905) was opened in Shengavit. 

During the 1940s, the production of chemicals and electrical tools was boosted by the Soviet government. In 1940, the Nairit Chemicals Plant and ArmElectroMash plant for electrical equipments were opened. In 1943, the Yerevan Tire plant, Yerevan Polyvinyl acetate factory, Yerevan Compressors plant, and Yerevan Textile factory were opened, followed by the Yerevan Cable Factory in 1945. 

The Yerevan Wool plant was opened in 1951, followed by the Chemreagent plant for chemical reactors in 1953, while the Electroapparat Yerevan electrical equipments plant was opened in 1956. In 1960 and 1961, the Yerevan Electron plant for electrical machines and the new building of the Yerevan Leather Factory (operating since 1894) were opened respectively in Shengavit. In 1962, the Masis shoe factory of Yerevan was formed in the district as a result of the consolidation of several factories in the city. In 1963 and 1967, the Yerevan plant for chemical reactors and Yerevan chemical-pharmaceutical firm were opened respectively.

The Yerevan poultry farm of Charbakh was opened in 1957.

However, after the independence of Armenia, most of the heavy industry plants were abandoned or only survived with their minor capacities.

Post-independence industry
During the revival period after the economic crisis, many new large plants were inaugurated in Shengavit, including: Arantsk plant for roof fittings since 1995, Grand Tobacco for tobacco products since 1997, Shen Production for paints and building materials since 1999, Grand Candy factory for food products since 2000, Megerian handmade carpets mill since 2000, Shogh vegetable oil producing industrial complex since 2001, Mikmetal for metal structures since 2003, Narsan plant for roof fittings since 2003, Yerevan Metal Group Factory for steel products since 2007, Alex Grig alcohol plant in 2007 (replacing the former Polyvinyl acetate factory), Megerian Shin for metal structures since 2009, and Sil-Maaza plant for water and beverages since 2012, and Alex Textile hosiery plant since 2015.

Minor industrial firms of the district include: Eurostan Uyut for building materials since 1987, Hayk-Mek Wood Plant since 1991, Moks Plast for plastic products since 1995, MMM Plant for building materials since 1997, Veks Group for building materials since 1997, Daroink Food Plant since 1998, Karastan plant for building materials since 2000, Latino coffee processing plant since 2005, Anush plant for food products since 2005, Ekoprof plant for building materials since 2006, Orient Stone plant for building materials since 2009, AR Garment Factory, and Crystal plant for household chemicals.

Services

Arshakunyats Avenue of Shengavit is home to many trade shops, galleries and commercial offices, including the "Synopsys Armenia" headquarters and "Hayrenik" cinema-theatre. It is also home to Yerevan Mall, one of the largest shopping centres in Armenia. Many other large shopping centres are also operating in Shengavit, including "Petak" Trade Center, "Yerevan" Market, and "AR-BE" Armenian-Belarusian Trading House.  

The Shengavit Medical Center and Surb Astvatsamayr (Holy Mother of God) Medical Center are among the prominent hospitals of Yerevan.

Education
Almost 15% of the public schools of Yerevan are located in Shengavit. As of 2016-17, the district has 29 public education schools, 2 private schools, as well as 1 vocational school.

The Panos Terlemezyan Yerevan State College of Fine Arts (opened in 1921) is located on the Arshakunyats Avenue of Shengavit.

Sport

Shengavit is home to many prominent sport venues of Yerevan, including:
Alashkert Stadium, opened as Nairi Stadium in 1960, home to Alashkert FC since 2011.
Mika Stadium, opened in 2008, was home to currently-inactive FC Mika.
Mika Sports Arena, opened in 2009, is the home ground of the Armenia national basketball team.
Hovik Hayrapetyan Equestrian Centre, opened in 2001.
Junior Sport Stadium, formerly known as Shengavit Football School, was operated by the currently-inactive Ulisses FC until 2014.

The district is also home to several sport schools, including:
Children and youth complex sport school of Shengavit, opened in 1946, specialized in basketball, handball, chess, field hockey, sanda-wushu, volleyball and boxing.
Children and youth table tennis and tennis sport school of Shengavit, opened in 1948.
Children and youth sport school of acrobatics and rhythmic gymnastics of Shengavit, opened in 1970.
Yerevan Chess Academy, opened in 1996.
Grand Sports Centre, opened in 2011, home to indoor sports arena, swimming pool and many outdoor sports facilities.
Rafael Vaganian children and youth chess school of Shengavit, opened in 2015.
Children and youth Republican sport school of shooting.
Children and youth cycling specialized school of Olympic reserve.

The district is also represented at the Armenian Futsal Premier League through the Charbakh Yerevan Futsal Club formed in 2015.

Gallery

References

Populated places in Armenia
Districts of Yerevan